Affengeil (English title: Life is Like a Cucumber)  is a 1990 German semi-documentarian film by Rosa von Praunheim. The film was shown at the 1991 Toronto International Film Festival and 1992 at the Frameline Film Festival in San Francisco, among others.

Plot
Film about the life of Lotti Huber, who was discovered by Rosa von Praunheim for the big stage when she was almost 70 years old. The multi-talented artist tells a moving story about catastrophes and successes that she has experienced.

Reception
"Lotti is an ingenious grotesque and a consummate performer." (The Motion Picture Guide, 1993) The German Frankfurter Allgemeine Zeitung wrote: "Praunheim's fictional documentaries or documentary fictions, however one may categorize the works of the auteur filmmaker, are characterized on the one hand by an amazingly self-deprecating sincerity and on the other hand by a deeply affectionate description of the people in his worlds. [...] Legendary are his portraits of the maternal muse Lotti Huber. He erected monuments to the extravagant actress, dancer and diseuse of the Berlin underground [...]."

Notes

References 
Murray, Raymond. Images in the Dark: An Encyclopedia of Gay and Lesbian Film and Video Guide. TLA Publications, 1994,

External links

1990 films
West German films
Films directed by Rosa von Praunheim
1990 documentary films
German documentary films
1990s German-language films
1990s German films